1939 Loretta, provisional designation , is a carbonaceous Themistian asteroid from the outer region of the asteroid belt, approximately 30 kilometers in diameter. It was discovered on 17 October 1974, by American astronomer Charles Kowal at Palomar Observatory in California, who named it after his daughter, Loretta Kowal. The discovery of the asteroid took place during Kowal's follow-up observations of Jupiter's moon Leda, which he had discovered one month prior.

Orbit and classification 

Loretta is a member of the Themis family, a dynamical family of main-belt asteroids with nearly coplanar ecliptical orbits. It orbits the Sun in the outer main-belt at a distance of 2.7–3.5 AU once every 5 years and 6 months (2,015 days). Its orbit has an eccentricity of 0.13 and an inclination of 1° with respect to the ecliptic.

Physical characteristics 

Loretta has been characterized as a carbonaceous C-type asteroid.

Diameter and albedo 

According to the surveys carried out by the Japanese Akari satellite and NASA's Wide-field Infrared Survey Explorer with its subsequent NEOWISE mission, Loretta measures between 26.3 and 30.4 kilometers in diameter, and its surface has an albedo between 0.092 and 0.101. The Collaborative Asteroid Lightcurve Link derives an albedo of 0.072 and a diameter of 29.8 kilometers with an absolute magnitude of 11.1.

Rotation period 

A fragmentary rotational lightcurve of Loretta was obtained from photometric observations made by French amateur astronomer Pierre Antonini in March 2011. It gave an approximate rotation period of 25 hours with a brightness variation of 0.12 magnitude.

Naming 

This minor planet was named by the discoverer after his daughter, Loretta Kowal. The official  was published by the Minor Planet Center on 1 June 1975.

References

External links 
 Asteroid Lightcurve Database (LCDB), query form (info )
 Dictionary of Minor Planet Names, Google books
 Asteroids and comets rotation curves, CdR – Observatoire de Genève, Raoul Behrend
 Discovery Circumstances: Numbered Minor Planets (1)-(5000) – Minor Planet Center
 
 

001939
Discoveries by Charles T. Kowal
Named minor planets
19741017